"Me Vs Me" is a song by American rapper Moneybagg Yo from his third studio album Time Served (2020). It was released on May 8, 2020, as the fourth single from the album, and the only single from the deluxe edition from the album. A music video of the song was released on the same day. It has over 145 million views as of September 2022.

Charts

Certifications

References

2020 singles
2020 songs
Moneybagg Yo songs
Interscope Records singles